Cascade Inlet is a fjord in the North Coast region of the Canadian province of British Columbia. It extends northwest from Dean Channel. It was first charted in 1793 by George Vancouver and Spelman Swaine during their 1791-95 expedition. Vancouver named it "Cascade Channel" due to the great number of waterfalls he saw along its sides when he first explored the inlet.

References

External links
 

Fjords of British Columbia
North Coast of British Columbia
Inlets of British Columbia